Novoshareyevo (Yañı Şäräy) is a rural locality (a village) in Lipovsky Selsoviet, Arkhangelsky District, Bashkortostan, Russia. The population was 223 as of 2010. There are 7 streets.

Geography 
Novoshareyevo is located 25 km north of Arkhangelskoye (the district's administrative centre) by road. Novye Sarty is the nearest rural locality.

References 

Rural localities in Arkhangelsky District